1927 Finnish Figure Skating Championships were held in Helsinki on 13 February 1927.

Men's single skating 

Source:

Women's single skating 

Source:

Pair skating 

Source:

Sources

References 

 

Finnish Figure Skating Championships
1927 in figure skating
1927 in Finnish sport
February 1927 sports events
1920s in Helsinki
Sports competitions in Helsinki